Screwball Comedy is an album by the Japanese band Soul Flower Union.  The album found the band going into a simpler, harder-rocking direction, after several heavily world-music influenced albums.

Track listing

External links

2002 albums